Obio-Akpor is a local government area in the metropolis of Port Harcourt, one of the major centres of economic activities in Nigeria, and one of the major cities of the Niger Delta, located in Rivers State.  The local government area covers 260 km2 and at the 2006 Census held a population of 464,789. Its postal code or ZIP code is 500102. Obio-Akpor has its headquarters at Rumuodomaya and it is peopled by the Ikwerre

Geography
Obio-Akpor is bounded by Port Harcourt (local government area) to the south, Oyigbo and Eleme to the east, Ikwerre and Etche to the north, and Emohua to the west. It is located between latitudes 4°45'N and 4°60'N and longitudes 6°50'E and 8°00'E.

Climate

Geology and relief
Covering around 90 sq mi, Obio-Akpor is generally a lowland area with average elevation below 30 metres above sea level. Its geology comprises basically of alluvial sedimentary basin and basement complex. The thick mangrove forest, raffia palms and light rainforest are the major types of vegetation. Due to high rainfall, the soil in the area is usually sandy or sandy loam. It is always leached, underlain by a layer of impervious pan. The LGA is also rich in Agriculture

Localities, towns and suburbs
The following localities, townships and suburbs, are within Obio-Akpor:

 Alakahia
 Atali
 Ada-George Road
 Awalama
 Choba
 Egbelu
 Elelenwo
 Eligbam
 Elimgbu
 Elioparanwo
 Eliozu
 Eneka
 Eligbolo
 Iriebe
 Mgbuesilaru
 Mgbuoba
 Mgbuosimini
 Mpakurche
 Nkpa
 Nkpelu
 Ogbogoro
 Oginigba
 Oro-Igwe
 Oroazi
 Ozuoba
 Rukpakwolusi
 Rukpokwu
 Rumuadaolu
 Rumuaghaolu
 Rumualogu 
 Rumuchiorlu
 Rumudara
 Rumudogo
 Rumuekini
 Rumuekwe
 Rumueme
 Rumuepirikom
 Rumuesara
 Rumuewhara
 Rumuibekwe
 Rumuigbo
 Rumukalagbor
 Rumunduru
 Rumuobiokani
 Rumuogba
 Rumuokparali
 Rumuolumeni
 Rumuobochi
 Rumuodomaya
 Rumuoji
 Rumuokoro
 Rumuokwu
 Rumuokwachi
 Rumuokwuota
 Rumuokwurusi
 Rumuola
 Rumuolukwu
 Rumuomasi
 Rumuomoi
 Rumuosi
 Rumuoto
 Rumurolu
 Rumuwaji
 Rumuwegwu
 Trans Amadi
 Woji

Government
Obio-Akpor is one of the 8 local government areas that formed the Rivers East senatorial district. It consists of 17 electoral wards administered by the Obio-Akpor Local Government Council. The council comprises the chairman who is the chief executive of the local government area, and other elected members who are referred to as councillors.
The chairman is normally elected, but can, under special circumstances, also be appointed. He or she has the duty to supervise the activities of the local government, and preside over all meetings of the council.

Wards

Chairmen
To date, only 7 individuals have served as chairman of Obio-Akpor local government council. The list below does not include persons who have served as either a caretaker committee chairman or an administrator. For that information, see list of chairmen and caretaker committee chairmen of Obio-Akpor.

List of chairmen:

Education

Colleges and universities
Obio-Akpor contains the following colleges and universities within its
boundaries: 
 Catholic Institute of West Africa
 Eastern Polytechnic, Rumuokwurusi
 Ignatius Ajuru University of Education, Rumuolumeni
 Rivers State College of Health Science and Technology, Rumueme
 University of Port Harcourt, Choba
 Captain Elechi Amadi Polytechnic, Rumuola, Port Harcourt
 Rivers State University, Mile 3, Port Harcourt

Primary and secondary schools
The region is home to several
public and private schools for both elementary and secondary education. Below is a listing of schools operating in the local government area including those managed by the Roman Catholic Diocese of Port Harcourt:

 Archdeacon Crowther Memorial Girls' School, Elelenwo
 Ash Merlyn International School, Elelenwo
 CITA International School, Rumuogba
 De World International Secondary School
 Dee Salem International School, Elelenwo
 Emilio Piazza Memorial School, Rumuigbo
 Government Secondary School, Eneka
 Jephthah Comprehensive Secondary School
 La Pierre Angulaire High School
 Liora Schools, Elelenwo
 Loretto School of Childhood, Rumuigbo
 Marygold International School, Elelenwo
 Niger Delta Science School
 Shalom International School
 St Maria Goretti's School
 St. Benedict Immaculate Canadian Academy
 The Donbridge School, Rumukwuta
 Topline Schools, Elelenwo
 Trans Amadi International School
 TiTARe Academy, Rumudara
 Woodville School
 Brainfield Secondary School, East-West Road, Eliogbolo
Cedar Court British International School, Airport Road, Rukpokwu
Gafed International School, Rumuodara
Dee Salem International School, Elelenwo

Media
Obio-Akpor is undoubtedly, one of the major hubs for media in Rivers State. Elelenwo is the location of Radio Rivers 99.1, the first government-owned FM radio station in the state, and the second FM radio station to launch in Nigeria. Also headquartered in the neighbourhood is Rivers State Television whose signal is received in parts of nine states.

In October 2003, DAAR Communications Plc launched its radio and television stations which are transmitted from Choba.

In 2008, Pidgin English radio station Wazobia FM 94.1 began broadcasting from its studios in Rumuosi.

Still in 2008, Multimesh Group established The Family Love FM radio station transmitting from Rumuogba.

Notable people
 
 
John Azuta-Mbata, politician
Monalisa Chinda, actress
Tonto Dike, actress
Frank Eke, former Deputy Governor of Rivers State, Eze Gbakagbaka of Ikwerre II
Duncan Mighty (born 1983), musician
Daisy W. Okocha, former Chief Judge of Rivers State
Ezenwo Nyesom Wike, Governor of Rivers State
Obi Wali, PhD, former distinguished senator, writer, activist
Okey Wali, SAN, former president of the Nigeria Bar Association
Julius Agwu, Nigeria stand-up comedian, actor, singer and MC

References

External links

 
Local Government Areas in Rivers State
Populated places established in 1989
Geography of Port Harcourt
1989 establishments in Nigeria
1980s establishments in Rivers State